The East Kowloon Cultural Centre is an under construction arts complex in Ngau Tau Kok, Kowloon, Hong Kong. It will be located on part of the former site of Lower Ngau Tau Kok Estate, directly across Kwun Tong Road from Kowloon Bay station. It will be built on a  site at an estimated cost of $4.1 billion and is expected to open in 2021.

The centre will house five performance halls including a 1,200-seat multi-purpose hall and a 550-seat theatre, plus three smaller venues. It was designed by Rocco Yim and the Architectural Services Department.

History
The Urban Council explored the provision of a regional cultural centre in East Kowloon as early as the mid-1980s. A site was chosen in Sai Tso Wan immediately south of the Kwun Tong Magistracy. The Kwun Tong District Board strongly advocated a 1000-seat auditorium but the Council doubted the prospective utilisation rate of such a facility. Instead, the Kwun Tong Bypass and an electric substation were built on the site.

Alongside new public housing, a civic centre was also included in the redevelopment plans for the former Lower Ngau Tau Kok Estate. This was endorsed by Kwun Tong District Council in November 2006.

Construction commenced in 2016, and is expected to be complete in 2020. The contractor is Leighton Contractors (Asia) Limited.

Facilities
 auditorium (1,200 seats)
 theatre (550 seats)
 three studios for music, dance and drama (120-250 seats each)
 large rehearsal room
 two small rehearsal rooms

References

Ngau Tau Kok
Concert halls in Hong Kong
Music venues in Hong Kong
Theatres in Hong Kong